Maman Last Call is a Canadian comedy-drama film, released in 2005. An adaptation of Nathalie Petrowski's 1995 novel, the film was written by Petrowski and directed by François Bouvier.

The film stars Sophie Lorain as Alice Malenfant, a career-oriented journalist who has resisted marrying and start a family with her boyfriend Louis (Patrick Huard), but unexpectedly finds herself pregnant.

Petrowski garnered a Genie Award nomination for Best Adapted Screenplay at the 26th Genie Awards.

References

External links 
 

2005 films
Canadian comedy-drama films
Films directed by François Bouvier
2005 comedy-drama films
French-language Canadian films
2000s Canadian films